The 2017–18 Liga FPD season, also known as Campeonato Banco Popular for sponsorship reasons, is the 97th since its establishment. The tournament is the first since the 2006–07 season to use the Apertura and Clausura names to their short tournaments, marking a departure from the Invierno and Verano tournaments.

The Voit Lummo is the official match ball of the tournament. Herediano entered as the defending champions, but lost the title in the Apertura finals to Pérez Zeledón.

Teams
Twelve teams contested for the league title; ten sides from the 2016–17 season, one team promoted from the Liga de Ascenso and a newly formed team.

Grecia were promoted for their debut in the Liga FPD after defeating Jicaral in the Liga de Ascenso final, thus replacing San Carlos in the Liga FPD.

Guadalupe is a newly established team that take over the previous franchise of Belén. UNAFUT authorized the name change just two days before the beginning of the season.

On 2 June 2017 Henning Jensen, rector of the University of Costa Rica, announced the cease of the agreement between the university and its homonymous club, citing that the transfer of the administrative management of the team to the Colombian company Con Talla Mundial was neither requested nor advised to the university. Jensen also stated that the club did not comply with the correction in the financial part of the club. On 19 June 2017, Con Talla Mundial announced that the club will now be under the name "Universitarios FC". The administration of the team had revealed the team badge and their intentions to use the Estadio Nacional as their home stadium. However, the Asociación Filial Club de Fútbol UCR, which holds the rights of the team within the league, sued the University because of their cease of the agreement. The club then retains its original name and is due to return to the Estadio Ecológico.

Stadia and locations

Torneo Apertura

The Apertura tournament will be played in the second half of 2017, starting on 29 July and, given the possibility of a final, ending on 23 December. The tournament is dedicated to former referee Luis Paulino Siles who, in 1982, became the first Costa Rican to officiate a match at a FIFA World Cup.

The tournament began with two scoreless draws in the UCR vs Cartaginés and Herediano vs Guadalupe matches. Saprissa's Luis Stewart Pérez scored the first goal of the tournament, during his team's match against Carmelita.

Regular season
Defending champions Herediano topped the season undefeated with 54 points. By achieving this, Herediano broke two records in the league. They became the first team with the longest undefeated streak (surpassing the 21-match streak by Saprissa in the 2003–04 season, the team being coincidentally managed by Hernán Medford). The team also broke the record for more points achieved in a regular season, surpassing Alajuelense in the 2014 Invierno season.

On 3 September 2017, the match between Saprissa and Grecia was suspended at the 81st minute due to a false bomb threat. The remaining nine minutes were played the next morning.

Standings

Quadrangular – Apertura

Standings

Apertura finals
Since regular season leaders Herediano were unable to top the quadrangular stage, a double-legged final will be played against the quadrangular winner Pérez Zeledón in order to determine the champions of the Apertura tournament. By getting more points in the aggregate table, Herediano will host the second leg.

Torneo Clausura
The Clausura tournament will be played in the first half of 2018, starting on 7 January and, given the possibility of a final, ending on 20 May. The tournament is dedicated to the Costa Rica national football team squad that played in the 1990 FIFA World Cup, represented by their captain Róger Flores.

Regular season

Standings

Positions by round

Results

Quadrangular – Clausura

Clausura Finals
Since regular season leaders Herediano were unable to top the quadrangular stage, a double-legged final will be played against the quadrangular winner Saprissa in order to determine the champions of the Clausura tournament.

Aggregate table

References

External links
 UNAFUT - Primera División de Costa Rica

Liga FPD seasons
2017–18 in Costa Rican football